Sir John Morton, 2nd Baronet (c. 1627–1699) of Milbourne St Andrew in Dorset, was an English landowner and politician who sat in the House of Commons between 1661 and 1695.

Origins
He was the eldest surviving son of Sir George Morton, 1st Baronet (d.1662) of Milbourne St Andrew, by his second wife Anne Wortley, a daughter of Sir Richard Wortley of Wortley, Yorkshire, and widow of Sir Rotherham Willoughby. On the Restoration in 1660 he became Gentleman of the Privy Chamber.

Career
In 1661, he was elected a Member of Parliament for Poole, Dorset, in the Cavalier Parliament and sat until 1679. He succeeded to the baronetcy on the death of his father in 1662. He was elected an MP for Weymouth and Melcombe Regis, Dorset, on 22 August 1679 and sat until 1695.

Marriages
He married twice:
Firstly, before 1664, to Eleanor Fountain (d.1671), a daughter of John Fountain, Serjeant at Law), buried at Milborne;
Secondly, by licence issued on 24 February 1676, he married Elizabeth Culme, a daughter of the Rev. Benjamin Culme, Doctor of Divinity, Dean of St. Patrick's Cathedral, Dublin, by his wife Deborah Pleydell (1623-1695) a daughter of Sir Charles (or Oliver) Pleydell (son of Gabriel Pleydell (d. circa 1591), MP, of Midg Hall  in the parish of Lydiard St John (later Lydiard Tregoze) in Wiltshire) by his second wife Jane St. John, a daughter of Sir John St. John, four-times a Member of Parliament for Bedfordshire, of Lydiard St John's (now Lydiard Tregoze), Wiltshire. By Elizabeth Culme he had one daughter:
Anne Morton, who married Edmund Pleydell of Midge Hall.

Death and burial
Morton died without a male heir in 1699, aged 71, and the baronetcy thus became extinct. He was buried at Milborne St Andrew, Dorset.

References

|-

1620s births
1699 deaths
Year of birth uncertain
English MPs 1661–1679
Baronets in the Baronetage of England
English MPs 1680–1681
English MPs 1681
English MPs 1685–1687
English MPs 1689–1690
English MPs 1690–1695